Three Songs for Benazir (دری سندری د بینظیر لپاره) is an Academy Award nominated 2021 Afghan-American documentary short film by Elizabeth Mirzaei and Gulistan Mirzaei.

Summary
The story of Shaista, a young man who—newly married to Benazir and living in a camp for displaced people in Kabul—struggles to balance his dreams of being the first from his tribe to join the Afghan National Army with the responsibilities of starting a family. Even as Shaista’s love for Benazir is palpable, the choices he must make to build a life with her have shattering consequences.

Release 
The film had its world premiere at the Full Frame Documentary Film Festival in June, 2021, where it won the Jury Award for Best Short and qualified for the Oscars. In August, 2021, the film had its European premiere at the Odense International Film Festival, where it won the Soapbox Award. In February 2022, Three Songs for Benazir won Outstanding Nonfiction Short at the Cinema Eye Honors.

In December 2021, it was announced that Netflix had acquired distribution rights to the film, and set it for a January 24, 2022, release.

Accolades
94th Academy Awards: Academy Award for Best Documentary (Short Subject) - Nominated
Cinema Eye Honors: Outstanding Nonfiction Short - Winner
Full Frame Documentary Film Festival: Best Documentary Short - Winner
Clermont-Ferrand International Short Film Festival: Audience Award - Winner
Australian Screen Editors: ASE Award - Winner
Odense International Film Festival: Soapbox Award - Winner
Yamagata International Documentary Film Festival: Award of Excellence - Winner
Message to Man: Best Documentary Short - Winner
Social Impact Media Awards: Best Short Documentary - Winner

References

External links
Official trailer
Official website

Three Songs for Benazir on IMDb

2021 short documentary films
American short documentary films
Documentary films about refugees
Documentary films about Afghanistan